The Dave & Kerley Show is an Australian television series that airs on Channel [V]. It first began airing on 6 April 2008, and had a run of 13 episodes, finishing on 29 June 2008. It is hosted by Dave Lawson and James Kerley, who had previously hosted Nickelodeon's Sarvo together for two years from 2005 to 2007.

External links
 Official website

Channel V Australia original programming
2008 Australian television series debuts
2008 Australian television series endings